Meir Benjamin Menahem Danon (– 22 November 1854) was a rabbinical writer, and chief rabbi of Sarajevo in Bosnia, who lived in the first half of the nineteenth century. He wrote Be'er ba-sadeh ('A Well in the Field'; Jerusalem, 1846), a supercommentary on Rashi's commentary to the Torah, and on its supercommentator, Elijah Mizraḥi.

Publications

References
 

1854 deaths
19th-century Jewish biblical scholars
Rabbis of the Austrian Empire
Burials at the Jewish cemetery on the Mount of Olives
Writers from Sarajevo
Rabbis from Sarajevo